Brady is an Irish given name meaning "descendant of Bradach". Brady was the 69th most popular baby name in 2020, and the 273rd for U.S. baby names.

Given name

A
Brady Ackerman (born 1969), American sports commentator
Brady L. Adams (1945–2015), American politician
Brady Aiken (born 1996), American baseball player
Brady Anderson (born 1964), American baseball executive
Brady Anderson (footballer) (born 1975), Australian rules footballer
Brady Austin (born 1993), Canadian ice hockey player

B
Brady Ballew (born 1992), American soccer player
Brady Barends (born 1989), South African cricketer
Brady Barnett (born 1989), New Zealand cricketer
Brady Barr (born 1963), American herpetologist
Brady Beeson (born 1987), American football player
Brady Blade (born 1965), American musician
Brady Bluhm, American actor
Brady Boswell (born 1997), American stock car driver
Brady Boyd (born 1967), American pastor
Brady Brammer, American politician
Brady Breeze (born 1997), American football player
Brady Browne (born 1983), Canadian football player
Brady Bryant (born 1982), American soccer player

C
Brady Canfield (born 1963), American skeleton racer
Brady Christensen (born 1996), American football player
Brady Clark (born 1973), American baseball player
Brady Clark (curler) (born 1977), American curler
Brady Cook (born 2001), American football player
Brady Corbet (born 1988), American actor

D
Brady J. Deaton (born 1942), American educator
Brady Dougan (born 1959), American banker

E
Brady Ellison (born 1988), American archer

F 

 Brady Feigl, two American baseball players
 Brady G. Feigl (born 1995)
 Brady M. Feigl (born 1990)

G
Brady P. Gentry (1896–1966), American politician
Brady Gollan (born 1965), Canadian snooker player
Brady Grey (born 1995), Australian rules footballer

H
Brady Haran (born 1976), Australian filmmaker
Brady Heslip (born 1990), Canadian basketball player
Brady Hicks, American journalist
Brady Hjelle (born 1990), American ice hockey player
Brady Hoke (born 1958), American football coach

J
Brady Jones (born 1988), Australian cricketer

K
Brady Keeper (born 1996), American ice hockey player
Brady Kennett (born 1974), New Zealand race car driver
Brady Keys (1936–2017), American football player
Brady Kiernan, American filmmaker
Brady Kurtz (born 1996), Australian speedway rider

L
Brady Lail (born 1993), American baseball player
Brady Leisenring (born 1982), American ice hockey player
Brady Leman (born 1986), Canadian skier

M
Brady Malam (born 1973), New Zealand rugby league footballer
Brady Manek (born 1998), American basketball player
Brady McDonnell (born 1977), American football player
Brady E. Mendheim Jr. (born 1968), American judge

N
Brady Nelson (born 1978), American businessman
Brady North (born 1991), American baseball coach

P
Brady Parks (born 1989), American musician
Brady Paxton (born 1947), American politician
Brady Poppinga (born 1979), American football player

R
Brady Raggio (born 1972), American baseball player
Brady Rawlings (born 1981), Australian rules footballer
Brady Reardon (born 1986), Canadian skier
Brady Rodgers (born 1990), American baseball player
Brady Rush (born 1999), New Zealand rugby union footballer

S
Brady Sallee, American basketball coach
Brady Scott (born 1999), American soccer player
Brady Seals (born 1969), American musician
Brady Sheldon (born 1993), American football player
Brady Sih (born 1970), Taiwanese sailor
Brady Singer (born 1996), American baseball player
Brady Skjei (born 1994), American ice hockey player
Brady Smith (disambiguation), multiple people
Brady Stewart (born 1982), American powerlifter

T
Brady Tkachuk (born 1999), American ice hockey player
Brady Toops (born 1981), American singer-songwriter

U
Brady Udall, American writer

W
Brady Wagoner (born 1980), American-Danish psychologist
Brady Walker (1921–2007), American basketball player
Brady Walkinshaw (born 1984), American politician
Brady Watt (born 1990), Australian golfer
Brady Wilks (born 1980), American photographer
Brady Williams (born 1979), American baseball manager
Brady Wiseman, American politician

See also
Brady (disambiguation), a disambiguation page
Brady (surname), people with the surname of Brady

References

See also
Bradie (disambiguation)

English-language masculine given names